Boyd Winchester (September 23, 1836 – May 18, 1923) was a United States representative from Kentucky. He was born in Ascension Parish, Louisiana. He pursued preparatory studies and then attended Centre College in Danville, Kentucky and the University of Virginia at Charlottesville, Virginia. He graduated from the law department of the University of Louisville, Kentucky, in 1857 and commenced practice in Louisville, Kentucky.

Winchester was a member of the Kentucky Senate in 1867 and 1868 when he resigned. He was elected as a Democrat to the Forty-first and Forty-second Congresses (March 4, 1869 – March 3, 1873) but was not a candidate for renomination in 1872. After leaving Congress, he resumed the practice of law in Louisville, Kentucky and was the president of an insurance company 1875-1877. Winchester was president of the Democratic State convention in 1884. He was also appointed Minister Resident and consul general to Switzerland and served from 1885 to 1889. Building on the experience and observations made during his tenure, he wrote the book "The Swiss Republic", the publication of which coincided with the 600th anniversary of the foundation of the Swiss Confederation.

Winchester died in Louisville, Kentucky was buried in Cave Hill Cemetery.

References

External links

1836 births
1923 deaths
People from Ascension Parish, Louisiana
Politicians from Louisville, Kentucky
Democratic Party Kentucky state senators
Centre College alumni
University of Virginia alumni
University of Louisville School of Law alumni
Burials at Cave Hill Cemetery
Ambassadors of the United States to Switzerland
19th-century American diplomats
Democratic Party members of the United States House of Representatives from Kentucky